Hindmarsh Cemetery is located on the corner of Adam Street and South Road, Hindmarsh, South Australia and bounded by the River Torrens to the south.

The cemetery and Sexton's cottage were included in the South Australian Heritage Register on 23 November 1989.

History
The cemetery was originally planned and operated by committee appointed by the residents of Hindmarsh. A report in The Observer of 30 May 1846 noted that 2 acres were set aside for a cemetery, although the first burial occurred in the preceding month.

Control of the cemetery effectively passed to the Hindmarsh Council, with the first Cemetery Committee on 2 March 1927.

Interments

The first burial was of  Edward Hughes of Hindmarsh on 21 April 1846.
 Thomas Henry Brooker, (1850–1927) salesman, wood-merchant and politician
 Thomas Hardy, (1830–1912) winemaker
 Job Hallett, (1855–1940) brickmaker
 George Henry Michell, (~1832–1918) wool processing
 Agnes Anderson Milne, (1851–1919) factory inspector
 Edward Charles Vardon, (1866–1937) manufacturer and politician
 Joseph Vardon, (1843–1913) printer and politician

References

External links
 
 

Cemeteries in South Australia
1846 establishments in Australia
South Australian Heritage Register